Rumblers FC was a club which was founded by İstanbul Turks and Englishmen derived from Moda FC and Elpis FC in Turkey in 1911.

Honours
Istanbul Football League:
Runners-Up: 1911–1912

See also
List of Turkish Sports Clubs by Foundation Dates

Defunct football clubs in Turkey
Association football clubs established in 1911
Football clubs in Istanbul
Association football clubs disestablished in 1915
Sports clubs disestablished in 1915
1911 establishments in the Ottoman Empire
1915 disestablishments in the Ottoman Empire